The Zintan Brigades are armed units linked to the town of Zintan and its surrounding area, allied to, but separate from, the Libyan National Army. They played a large part in the Libyan Revolution which overthrew Gaddafi and are currently heavily involved in the 2014 Libyan Conflict on the anti-Islamist side. They are considered politically moderate/liberal within the Libyan political spectrum.

Organization
The Zintan Brigades are under the leadership of the Zintan Revolutionaries' Military Council and currently consist of:
 The Lightning Bolt (Sawaiq) Brigade
 The Qaaqaa Brigade
 The Civic Brigade (لواء المدني)

The Airport Security Battalion (for Tripoli International Airport) was linked to the Zintan Brigades, but its current status is uncertain.

History
The Zintan Revolutionaries' Military Council was formed in May 2011 to organize the military efforts and effectiveness of 23 militias in Zintan and the Nafusa mountains. The Council is one of the strongest militias in Libya.
Zintani Brigades detained Saif al-Islam Gaddafi after his capture in November 2011. One of its leaders, Osama al-Juwali, served as the Libyan defense minister from November 2011 to November 2012. The brigade is currently led by Mukhtar Kalifah Shahub, a former Libyan navy officer. The group has various Arabic-language media outlets. These include a satellite channel called Libya al-Watan and several websites and pages on Facebook.

The Zintan Brigades have been a major part of the conflict since the launch of Operation Dawn against Tripoli International Airport, because they were responsible for its defense.

References

Military of Libya
National Liberation Army (Libya)
First Libyan Civil War
Rebel groups in Libya